Billy Holowesko (born 14 August 1965) is a Bahamian sailor. He competed in the Star event at the 1992 Summer Olympics.

References

External links
 

1965 births
Living people
Bahamian male sailors (sport)
Olympic sailors of the Bahamas
Sailors at the 1992 Summer Olympics – Star
Place of birth missing (living people)